Several fishermen villages were established in Hong Kong to house fishermen families.

List of fishermen villages
As of 2006, the list of Existing Fishermen Villages was:

North District
 Ap Chau Fishermen's Village, on Ap Chau. Established in 1960 to improve living conditions

Yuen Long District
 Chung Hau Tsuen, in Shan Pui. Established in 1967

Tai Po District
 Tap Mun Fishermen's New Village, on Tap Mun. Established in 1964 to improve living conditions
 C.A.R.E. New Village, in Wong Yi Au, Tai Po Road (near Yuen Chau Tsai). Established in the mid-1960s to the 1970s to re-house fishermen's families who lost their boats during a typhoon
 Sam Mun Tsai Fishermen's New Village, on Yim Tin Tsai. Established in 1965 to re-house villagers affected by the construction project of Plover Cove Reservoir
 Luen Yick Fishermen Village, on Yim Tin Tsai. Established in 1975

Tsuen Wan District
 Ma Wan Fishermen's Village, on Ma Wan. Established in 1965 to improve living conditions

Sha Tin District
 Ah Kung Kok Fishermen Village in A Kung Kok. Established in 1984 to re-house villagers affected by the reclamation works for building Sha Tin Racecourse and Ma On Shan new town.

Kwai Tsing District
 Tsing Yi Fishermen's New Village, on Tsing Yi. Established in the 1960s and completed in 1965 by a donation of the Cooperative for American Relief Everywhere 
 St. Paul's Village, on Tsing Yi. Established in 1973

Sai Kung District
 Kwun Mun Fishermen Village in Tui Min Hoi. Established in 1978 to re-house villagers affected by the construction of the High Island Reservoir
 Man Yee Fishermen Village in Tui Min Hoi. Established in 1984 to re-house villagers affected by the construction of the High Island Reservoir
 Shui Bin Tsuen, in Hang Hau. Established in the 1970s to improve living conditions
 Tui Min Hoi Fishermen's Village in Tui Min Hoi. Established in 1963 to improve living conditions
 St. Peter Village in Tui Min Hoi. Established in 1964
 Ming Shun Village in Tui Min Hoi. Established in 1976
 Tai Ping Village in Po Lo Che. Established in the early 1970s

See also
 Housing in Hong Kong
 Agriculture and aquaculture in Hong Kong

References

 Fishermen
Housing in Hong Kong